Borgman is a surname.

Borgman may also refer to:

Borgman, West Virginia
Borgman (film), a 2013 Dutch film
Sonic Soldier Borgman, an anime series